Les Anges, formerly Les Anges de la téléréalité, is a reality TV show broadcast on NRJ 12.  In 2021, NRJ 12 announced to stop the TV show definitively.

Summary

Season 1: Los Angeles

Guest stars
Romain Chavent, a former Secret Story 2009 contestant and former husband of Shauna Sand.

Senna and Amelie were in a relationship on Secret Story, but during their stay in L.A they parted.

Ratings
The show was a ratings success for NRJ 12. After a rather timid start with only 250,000 viewers to 17:50, the latest qutotidienne have attracted nearly 500,000 viewers on average. That hearing will enable the chain to produce records and even to lead the audience of TNT.

Season 2: Miami Dreams

Guest stars
The first eight people of the L.A. season.
 
Diana and Brandon have been together for four years, before leaving the L'île de la tentation 2001 in separate.

Daniela and Jonathan have been a couple for Secret Story 2009, but Jonathan has broken with her for Sabrina, another candidate (Daniela already been eliminated during the break).

Julie and Amelie were friends at Secret Story 2010, but since Julie was in a relationship with Senna (Amelie's boyfriend, met in SS, and during the first season ofAngels) Amelie was hate. They are the enemy now.

Special guest stars
Actress, former Playboy model and a former contestant on Dancing with the Stars, Pamela Anderson, came into the house and gave advice to tenants (angels).

Rapper and former Celebrity and Ultimate Big Brother housemate, Coolio, comes to help and sings with Monia.

Singer Craig David.

Season 3: I Love New York 
Season 3 featured 10 Angels from reality TV and an anonymous/unknown "Angel".

Guest
Keenan Cahill
Clara Morgane
Gilles Luka
Lloyd Klein

Special Guest Star
Actress and former Dancing with the Stars 10 competitor Shannen Doherty.

Season 4: Club Hawaii 
In season 4, all twelve "Angels" worked at "Club Hawaï" ("Hawaii") to raise money for sick children. The charity was named "Le cœur des Anges". Catherine, the eldest "Angel", was in charge of fundraising and supervising other "Angels". All "Angels" lived in a house in Oahu. Throughout the season, some of them traveled to L.A. to attend go-sees and photo shoots as well as meet music producers and casting directors. Some "Angels" saw their dreams come true. Bruno had the opportunity to record a single and shoot a music video. Mohamed met professional dancers that helped him perfect his dancing. He also ended up being one of the dancers featured in Bruno's music video. Anthony trained Dennis Rodman. Aurélie met meteorologist Malika Dudley and flew to L.A. to interview Perez Hilton. She later came back to Honolulu to be a one-day TV correspondent for Hawaii News Now Sunrise. Nabilla traveled to L.A. to have the photo shoot of her dreams. Marie was offered a 3-year contract with Niche Talent in their life and style division and signed in a heartbeat.

Season 4 was one of the most controversial seasons, averaging 1–2 fights per episode. Marie and Geoffrey's relationship ended soon after their arrival in Hawaii, resulting in many arguments. Marie left the show before the end after finding out Geoffrey had had a tryst with Julia.

Season 5: Welcome to Florida 
Season 5 of the show was filmed in Fort Lauderdale, Florida.

Special Guest Stars
Ayem (Ayem Nour) – from Secret Story 5 – 2011 and from Hollywood Girls 1 and 2 – Mission: To find Nabilla
Kim (Kim Kardashian) from Dancing with the Stars (season 7 – 2008) – will make an appearance, coming into the house to give advice to tenants (angels).
Dita (Dita von Teese) – will make an appearance, coming into the house to give advice to tenants (angels).
Gilles Luka – Mission: To record a song for the tenants

Season 6: Australia 
Season 6 of the show is in Sydney and Melbourne.

Season 7: Latin America

Season 8: Pacific Dream (2016)

Season 9: Back To Paradise

Season 10: Let's celebrate

Season 11: Back to Miami

Les Vacances des Anges : All Stars

Les Vacances des Anges 2: Bienvenue chez les Grecs

Les Vacances des Anges 3: ¡ Viva España !

Les anges12 
Jeremy

Anissa

Kevin

Virgil

Yumee

Illan

Vanessa

Sarah

Jonhatan

Cloé

Rémy (Leona Winter)

Sofiane

Angélique

Participants have formerly appeared in earlier season of the show or on other television reality shows as follows:

Discography

Albums
In 2013, an album was released titled Les anges de la téléréalité: Allô que des Hits appearing at No. 29 in France in its first week of release and rising to No. 37 the following week.

Singles
During Les Anges de la téléréalité 4, a number of singles were launched. A group named Les Anges: le Group was also formed made up of Myriam, Bruno, Julia and Mohamed. Bruno had the single "Be mine". Les Anges sang "Prêts pour danser".

During Les Anges de la téléréalité 5, the collective Les Anges sang "Ocean Drive Avenue". Participant Maude Harcheb whose task was to record a hit in the United States, had a big success with her solo effort "Love Is What You Make of It" (reaching number 3 in France and number 12 in Belgian Wallonia francophone charts)

See also
 List of French television series

Les  anges12
Jeremy  
Kevin
Annisa 
Virgil 
Cloe

After this season, Angele, a candidate, filed a lawsuit against the production team for bullying. The show was permanently banned, as a consequence of the complaint deposited by Angele.

2011 French television series debuts
French reality television series
NRJ 12 original programming